Vittadinia is a genus of Australian and New Zealand plants in the tribe Astereae within the family Asteraceae.

Taxonomy
The genus Vittadinia is attributed to the French botanist Achille Richard in 1832. He described a species collected in New Zealand as Vittadinia australis, noting that although it had similarities to the genus Aster, there were sufficient differences to distinguish it. Two he considered significant were that Vittadinia has only two rows of involucral bracts and that its anthers are free and bent into a shape resembling a bayonet.

Although species of Vittadinia were described from Hawaii by Asa Gray, and are accepted by some sources, these are now considered to belong to the genus Tetramolopium by the online Flora of the Hawaiian Islands, so that Vittadinia does not occur in Hawaii.

Species
 currently accepted

 Vittadinia arida N.T.Burb. – WA NT Qld SA NSW 
 Vittadinia australasica (Turcz.) N.T.Burb. – sticky New Holland daisy – Qld NSW Vic SA NT WA Tas
 Vittadinia australis A.Rich. – NZ; naturalised in India
 Vittadinia bicolor N.T.Burb. – Qld 
 Vittadinia blackii N.T.Burb. – western New Holland daisy – NSW Vic SA WA 
 Vittadinia burbidgeae A.M.Gray & Rozefelds – Tas
 Vittadinia cervicularis N.T.Burb. – annual New Holland daisy – Qld NSW Vic SA NT WA 
 Vittadinia condyloides N.T.Burb. – club-hair New Holland daisy – NSW Vic SA WA 
 Vittadinia constricta N.T.Burb. – Qld 
 Vittadinia cuneata DC. – fuzweed, fuzzy New Holland daisy – Qld NSW Vic SA NT WA Tas
 Vittadinia decora N.T.Burb. – Qld
 Vittadinia diffusa N.T.Burb. – Qld
 Vittadinia dissecta (Benth.) N.T.Burb. – dissected New Holland daisy – Qld NSW Vic SA NT WA Tas
 Vittadinia eremaea N.T.Burb. – Qld NSW Vic SA NT WA 
 Vittadinia gracilis (Hook.f.) N.T.Burb. – woolly New Holland daisy – Qld NSW Vic SA NT WA Tas
 Vittadinia hispidula F.Muell. ex A.Gray – WA NT QldNSW 
 Vittadinia humerata N.T.Burb. – WA 
 Vittadinia megacephala (Benth.) J.M.Black – giant New Holland daisy – SA Vic
 Vittadinia muelleri N.T.Burb.  – nrrow-leaf New Holland daisy – Qld NSW V Tas
 Vittadinia nullarborensis N.T.Burb. – WA SA 
 Vittadinia obovata N.T.Burb. – WA NT Qld SA 
 Vittadinia pterochaeta (F.Muell. ex Benth.) J.M.Black – winged New Holland daisy, rough fuzzweed – Qld NSW Vic SA NT 
 Vittadinia pustulata N.T.Burb. – Qld NSW Vic SA NT WA 
 Vittadinia scabra DC. – Qld NT NSW 
 Vittadinia spechtii N.T.Burb. – NT WA 
 Vittadinia sulcata N.T.Burb.  – furrowed New Holland daisy – NSW Qld NT Vic SA WA 
 Vittadinia tenuissima (Benth.) J.M.Black – Western New Holland daisy, delicate New Holland daisy – NSW Qld Vic
 Vittadinia triloba (Gaudich.) DC. – NZ, NSW
 Vittadinia virgata N.T.Burb. – NT WA

 formerly included
Species formerly included in the genus Vittadinia, but now placed in Baccharis, Camptacra, Microgyne, Minuria and Tetramolopium, include:
 Vittadinia alinae F.Muell. – Tetramolopium alinae
 Vittadinia brachycomoides (F.Muell.) Benth. – Camptacra brachycomoides 
 Vittadinia chamissonis A.Gray – Tetramolopium lepidotum
 Vittadinia disticha S.Moore – Tetramolopium distichum 
 Vittadinia macra F.Muell. – Tetramolopium macrum 
 Vittadinia macrorhiza (DC.) A.Gray – Minuria macrorhiza 
 Vittadinia multifida Griseb. – Baccharis ulicina
 Vittadinia remyi A.Gray = Tetramolopium remyi
 Vittadinia trifurcata (Less.) Benth. & Hook.f. ex Griseb. – Microgyne trifurcata

References

Asteraceae genera
Astereae